Alaena picata is a butterfly in the family Lycaenidae. It is found in Kenya, Tanzania and Malawi. The habitat consists of rocky stream beds in forests and forest margins at altitudes ranging from 300 to 1,500 metres.

The larvae possibly feed on tree lichens.

Subspecies
Alaena picata picata (Kenya: south-east, including the coast, eastern Tanzania)
Alaena picata interrupta Hawker-Smith, 1933 (Malawi: south to the south-western slopes of Mount Mlanje)

References

Butterflies described in 1896
Alaena
Butterflies of Africa
Taxa named by Emily Mary Bowdler Sharpe